Bashgan (also Romanized as Bashgān; also known as Būshkān) is a village in Banesh Rural District, Beyza District, Sepidan County, Fars Province, Iran. At the 2006 census, its population was 140, in 31 families.

References 

Populated places in Beyza County